Fulton Township is one of eleven townships in Fountain County, Indiana, United States. As of the 2000 census, its population was 674.

Geography
It contains two unincorporated settlements:  Cates, in the eastern part of the township, and Silverwood in the southwest, just north of Lodi in Parke County. Indiana State Road 234 passes through Silverwood on its way east from Cayuga in neighboring Vermillion County.

Cemeteries
The township contains these six cemeteries: Baker, Bethel, Cates, Hibbs, Norton and Silver Island.

School districts
 Covington Community School Corporation

Political districts
 Indiana's 8th congressional district
 State House District 42
 State Senate District 23

References

 
 United States Census Bureau cartographic boundary files

External links
 Indiana Township Association
 United Township Association of Indiana

Townships in Fountain County, Indiana
Townships in Indiana